This is a list of sites where claims for the use of archaeoastronomy have been made, sorted by country.

The International Council on Monuments and Sites (ICOMOS) and the International Astronomical Union (IAU) jointly published a thematic study on heritage sites of astronomy and archaeoastronomy to be used as a guide to UNESCO in its evaluation of the cultural importance of archaeoastronomical sites around the world, which discussed sample sites and provided categories for the classification of archaeoastronomical sites. The editors, Clive Ruggles and Michel Cotte, proposed that archaeoastronomical sites be considered in four categories: 1) Generally accepted; 2) Debated among specialists; 3) Unproven; and 4) Completely refuted.

Armenia
 Zorats Karer (aka Carahunge), archeological site claimed to have astronomical significance although this is disputed. it is often referred to in international tourist lore as the "Armenian Stonehenge".

Australia
 Ngaut Ngaut oral tradition says these engravings represent lunar cycles.
 Wurdi Youang, a stone arrangement with possible solar alignments
 Stone structures at Lake Tyers traditionally used as an observatory

Brazil
 Parque Arqueológico do Solstício (called "Amazon Stonehenge"): An archaeological park located in Amapá state, Brazil, near the city of Calçoene. Archaeologists believe that this site was built by indigenous peoples for astronomical, ceremonial, or burial purposes, and likely a combination.

Bulgaria
 Magura Cave, Bronze Age "paintings of staggered black and white squares could have been used to count the days in a calendar month", possibly indicating the number of days in the solar tropical year.

Cambodia
 Angkor Wat
 Phnom Bakheng, According to Jean Filliozat of the École Française, the center tower represents the axis of the world and the 108 smaller ones represent the 4 lunar phases each with 27 days.

Canada
 Petroforms of North America are shapes and patterns made by lining up large rocks on the open ground made by various Native American and First Nation tribes in North America. They are believed to have been made as astronomical calendars.
 Medicine Wheel

Colombia
El Infiernito, (Spanish for "Little hell"), is a pre-Columbian Muisca site located in the outskirts of Villa de Leyva, Boyacá Department, Colombia. It is composed of several earthworks surrounding a setting of menhirs (upright standing stones); several burial mounds are also present. The site was a center of religious ceremonies and spiritual purification rites, and also served as a rudimentary astronomical observatory.

China
Puyang tomb, dated from 5000 BP, depicts a mosaic of constellations.
The Taosi Observatory: An astronomical observatory which is the oldest in East Asia, located in Xiangfen County, Shanxi, China.

Egypt
 Abu Simbel, The axis of the temple was positioned by the ancient Egyptian architects in such a way that twice a year, on October 20 and February 20, the rays of the sun would penetrate the sanctuary and illuminate the sculpture on the back wall, except for the statue of Ptah, the god connected with the Underworld, who always remained in the dark.
 Nabta Playa is an archaeological site in southern Egypt, containing what may be among the world's earliest known archeoastronomical devices from the 5th millennium BC. These include alignments of stones that may have indicated the rising of certain stars and a "calendar circle" that indicates the approximate direction of summer solstice sunrise.
 Precinct of Amun-Re

Finland
For example, the Kastelli of Raahe, which is one of the largest Giants' Churches, had its five "gates", i.e. wall openings, oriented towards the midsummer sunset, the winter solstice sunrise, winter solstice sunset, the sunrises of the mid-quarter days of early May (Walpurgis, Beltaine) and August (Lammas), as well as the sunrise 11 days before the vernal equinox in 2500 BC.

France
 Belchen System
 Carnac stones

Germany
 Belchen System
 Goseck circle
 Glauberg
 Magdalenenberg (disputed)
 The Pömmelte Circle Shrine

Guatemala
 Tikal
 Uaxactun

Honduras
Copán Ruinas 
El Puente

Indonesia
 Borobudur
 Prambanan

India
For a full list see the chapter on India in the ICOMOS book edited by Clive Ruggles and Michel Cotte. These sites include:
 Brahmagiri
 Hanamsagar
 Udayagiri
 Sun temples of Varanasi
 Vijayanagar
 Jantar Mantar
 Gyarah Sidi
Burzahom archaeological site
Lonar Lake
Stone circles of Junapani
J.M. Malville and Rana P.B. Singh have done much work on the archaeoastronomy of sacred sites in India.

Iran
 Persepolis
 Naqsh-e Rustam

Ireland 
 Newgrange, once a year, at the winter solstice, the rising sun shines directly along the long passage into the chamber for about 17 minutes and illuminates the chamber floor. (Generally accepted). It was built during the Neolithic period, around 3200 BC, making it older than Stonehenge and the Egyptian pyramids.
 Knowth is a Neolithic passage grave and ancient monument estimated to date from c. 3200 BC.
 Dowth in Boyne Valley, County Meath is a Neolithic passage tomb date with Astronomical alignments from between approximately 3200 and 2900 BC.
 Loughcrew near Oldcastle, County Meath is a group of megalithic tombs dating back to the 4th millennium BC, designed to receive the beams of the rising sun on the spring and autumnal equinox - the light shining down the passage and illuminating the art on the backstone.
 Carrowkeel
 Mound of the Hostages
 Drombeg stone circle, at the winter solstice, the sun sets into a v formed by two distant overlapping hills and makes an alignment with the altar stone and the two main uprights. Due to the nature of the site and the western hills, local sunset is c. 15:50.
 Beltany stone circle
 Beaghmore Stone Circles, a complex of early Bronze Age megalithic features, stone circles and cairns.  Some archaeologists believe that the circles have been constructed in relation to the rising of the sun at the solstice, or to record the movements of the sun and moon acting as observatories for particular lunar, solar or stellar events. Three of the stone rows point to the sunrise at the time of the solstice and another is aligned towards moonrise at the same period.

Italy
 Alatri
 Nuraghe

Kenya
 Namoratunga

Korea
 Cheomseongdae, ancient observatory in Gyeongju, Republic of Korea, from the 7th century.

Malta
 Megalithic Temples of Malta
 Mnajdra
 Tal-Qadi Temple

Mexico
 Calakmul
 Cantona
 Cañada de la Virgen
 Casas Grandes
 Chichen Itza
 The Caracol is theorized to be a proto-observatory with doors and windows aligned to astronomical events, specifically around the path of Venus as it traverses the heavens. (Debated among specialists).
 The main pyramid El Castillo (the Temple of Kukulkan) displays the appearance of a snake "crawling" down the pyramid at the spring equinox (Unproven).
 Coba
 Dzibilchaltun, Spring equinox, the sun rises so that it shines directly through one window of the temple and out the other.
 Ikil, Hierophany where the sunrise on the day of the solar zenith transit aligns with the summit of Ikil Structure 1 as viewed from an observation point within Ikil Cave 1.
 Izamal
 Mitla
 Monte Albán, zenith tube 
 Palenque
 La Quemada
 El Tajín
 Teotihuacan, the pecked-cross circles as survey-markers
 Tulum
 Uxmal, Venus alignment of the "Governor's Palace"
 Xochicalco, zenith tube
 Yagul

Netherlands
 Funnel Beaker Culture megalith graves ("hunebedden") in the eastern Netherlands might be oriented on moonrises.

North Macedonia 
 Kokino Situated 1030 m above sea level on the Tatićev Kamen Summit near Kumanovo.(disputed)

Palestine
Tell es-Sultan also known as Tel Jericho, is the site of ancient and biblical Jericho and today a UNESCO-nominated archaeological site in the West Bank.

Pakistan
 Lahore Fort
 Mohenjo Daro
 Taxila
 Harrapa
 Makli Graveyard

Peru
 Buena Vista
 Chankillo
 Cusco
 Machu Picchu
 Nazca Lines
 Choquequirao
 Ollantaytambo

Portugal
 Almendres Cromlech
 Anta Grande do Zambujeiro
 Dolmen of Cunha Baixa

Romania
 Sarmizegetusa Regia

Russia
 Arkaim

Saudi Arabia 

 Kaaba, has its corners and walls aligned or oriented towards risings and settings of celestial objescts.

Spain 
 Antequera Dolmens Site
 Peña de los Enamorados
 Dolmen of Menga

Syria
 Rujm el-Hiri is an ancient megalithic monument consisting of concentric circles of stone with a tumulus at center, in the Golan Heights, territory occupied by Israel. It is believed that the site was used as an ancient calendar. At the times of the two equinoxes, the sun's rays would pass between two rocks, at the eastern edge of the compound. The entrance to the center opens on sunrise of the summer solstice. Other notches in the walls indicate the spring and fall equinoxes. It is also believed the site was used for astronomical observations of the constellations, probably for religious calculations. Researchers found the site was built with dimensions and scales common for other period structures, and partly based on the stars' positions.

Sweden
 Ale's Stones

Switzerland
 Belchen System
 Columna Jovis

Turkey
 Göbekli Tepe

United Kingdom
 Avebury
 Ballochroy
 Boscawen-Un Winter Solstice sunrise out of the Lamorna Gap
 Bryn Celli Ddu – aligned with the summer solstice such that light illuminates a quartz rich stone at the back of the chamber
 Callanish Stones
 Durrington Walls
 Maeshowe, it is aligned so that the rear wall of its central chamber, a rough cube of five yards square held up by a bracketed wall, is illuminated on the winter solstice.
 Prehistoric Orkney
 St Edward the Confessor's Church, Leek.  Traditional site for observing a double sunset.
 Stonehenge (Generally accepted).
 Woodhenge

United States
 America's Stonehenge in New Hampshire
 Anderson Mounds, Anderson, Indiana.
 Bighorn Medicine Wheel
 Cahokia, large Mississippian culture site with numerous solar and other alignments
Cahokia Woodhenge, equinox and summer solstice sunrise/winter solstice sunset aligned timber circle
 Mound 72, summer solstice sunrise/winter solstice sunset aligned burial mound
 Casa Malpaís Archaeological Site, Springerville, Arizona.  Summer solstice at noon and sunset.
 Chaco Canyon, cardinal orientations, meridian alignment, inter-pueblo alignments
 The 3-Slab Site atop Fajada Butte in Chaco Canyon, which marks the solstices.
 Chimney Rock Archaeological Area, near Pagosa Springs, Colorado
 Crack Cave at Picture Canyon (Colorado) in Comanche National Grassland
 Emerald Mound and Village Site, Lebanon, Illinois
 Haleets on Bainbridge Island in Washington state
 Hovenweep Castle
 Holly Solstice Panel in Hovenweep National Monument
 Moorehead Circle, timber circle in Ohio
 Octagon Earthworks 
 Serpent Mound
 Skystone near Naches Trail in Washington state
 Wally's Dome in Sacramento Mountains (New Mexico)

See also 
 List of colossal sculpture in situ
 List of Egyptian pyramids
 List of megalithic sites
 List of menhirs
 List of Mesoamerican pyramids
 List of Roman bridges
 List of Roman domes
 List of statues
 List of tallest statues
 List of tallest statues in the United States
 List of world's largest domes
 New Seven Wonders of the World

References

Archaeoastronomy

.